Kyle Richardson (born April 7, 1991) is an American professional basketball player for Kagawa Five Arrows of the Japanese B.League.

References

External links
Portland State Vikings bio
Long Beach State 49ers bio

1991 births
Living people
Aisin AW Areions Anjo players
American expatriate basketball people in Japan
American men's basketball players
Aomori Wat's players
Basketball players from California
Earth Friends Tokyo Z players
Iwate Big Bulls players
Utsunomiya Brex players
Long Beach State Beach men's basketball players
Otsuka Corporation Alphas players
People from Lakewood, California
Portland State Vikings men's basketball players
Power forwards (basketball)
Sportspeople from Los Angeles County, California